Aromatic acids are a type of aromatic compound. Included in that class are substances containing an aromatic ring and an organic acid functional group.
There are several categories of aromatic acids including:
Phenolic acids: substances containing an aromatic ring and an organic carboxylic acid function (C6-C1 skeleton).
Aromatic amino acids

References